Hoghiz (or Olthévíz) is a commune in Brașov County, Transylvania, Romania. It is composed of six villages: Bogata Olteană (Oltbogát), Cuciulata (Katscheloden; Kucsuláta), Dopca (Dopich; Datk), Fântâna (Olthidegkút), Hoghiz and Lupșa (Lupsa).

Geography
The commune is situated on the Transylvanian Plateau, on the left bank of the Olt River.

Demographics
At the 2011 census, 68.4% of inhabitants were Romanians, 27.8% Hungarians and 3.6% Roma. At the 2002 census, 66.4% were Romanian Orthodox, 17.6% Unitarian, 8.4% Reformed, 3.1% Pentecostal and 2.8% Roman Catholic.

Natives
 Viorel Morariu (1931–2017), rugby union player
 Aron Pumnul (1818–1866), philologist, teacher, and national and revolutionary activist

Villages

Cuciulata

The village of Cuciulata was first attested in a document of 1372 as Vila Roczolod. It also appears as Kucsalota (1589), Kucstulata (1637) and Kociulata (1648). It is located on the south banks of Olt River at the base of the Perșani Mountains, and is crossed by Lupșa Creek. The road DJ104 passes through the village center and DC20 road connects Cuciulata to Lupșa village. Archaeological excavations have shown the existence of a settlement in this place in the Bronze Age. The ruins of a 1st-century BC Dacian stronghold have also been discovered. Among the monuments in the village are a  dating from 1700-1752 and a stone Orthodox church from 1784 to 1791.

See also

Castra of Hoghiz
Dacian fortress of Cuciulata

References

Communes in Brașov County
Localities in Transylvania